In enzymology, a phospholipid:diacylglycerol acyltransferase is an enzyme that catalyzes the chemical reaction

phospholipid + 1,2-diacylglycerol  lysophospholipid + triacylglycerol

Thus, the two substrates of this enzyme are phospholipid and 1,2-diacylglycerol, whereas its two products are lysophospholipid and triacylglycerol.

This enzyme belongs to the family of transferases, specifically those acyltransferases transferring groups other than aminoacyl groups.  The systematic name of this enzyme class is phospholipid:1,2-diacyl-sn-glycerol O-acyltransferase. This enzyme is also called PDAT.  This enzyme participates in glycerolipid metabolism.

An important human protein from this family is lecithin–cholesterol acyltransferase.

References 

 

EC 2.3.1
Enzymes of unknown structure